Tuoba Heru (died 325) ruled as prince of the Tuoba Dai 321 to 325. He was the son of Tuoba Yituo, and the brother of Tuoba Pugen and Tuoba Hena. In 321, when his cousin Tuoba Yulü was the Prince of Dai, Heru's mother, Lady Qi, launched a coup d'état against his cousin, killing Tuoba Yulü. She then installed Heru as the new Prince of Dai, but as he was still young at the time, actual power fell to his mother. He only began to personally rule in 324, but would die by the end of 325. He was succeeded by Tuoba Hena.

References

Northern Wei people
325 deaths
Princes of Dai (Sixteen Kingdoms)
Leaders who took power by coup
Year of birth unknown
Place of birth unknown